Anthony Michalek (January 16, 1878 – December 21, 1916; original surname Michálek) was a U.S. Representative for Illinois's 5th congressional district.

Anthony was born Antonín Michálek in Radvanov and immigrated to the United States with his older siblings and parents, Václav and Terezie [née Zelingrová], who settled in Chicago, Illinois, the same year. His father produced beer for the Siepp Brewing Company until his death in 1883, when his son was five years old. The younger Michalek attended the common schools and later worked professionally as a bookkeeper before entering politics.

Michalek was elected as a Republican to the 59th Congress (March 4, 1905 – March 3, 1907). He was an unsuccessful candidate for reelection in 1906 to the 60th Congress and for election in 1908 to the 61st Congress. He served as president and manager of a Chicago musical conservatory.

He died in Chicago on December 21, 1916, and was interred in St. Adalbert's Cemetery.

References

1878 births
1916 deaths
American people of Bohemian descent
Austro-Hungarian emigrants to the United States
American Roman Catholics
Politicians from Chicago
Republican Party members of the United States House of Representatives from Illinois
19th-century American politicians